Josep Puig Puig (22 February 1922 – 9 July 1997), known as Curta, was a Spanish football player who played as a defender. Although he came from Girona FC, the bulk of his career was spent at FC Barcelona. He also played for the national football team of Spain.

Career 

Curta spent two seasons at Girona FC (1939–40 and 1940–41) until he was signed by Barça in 1942. On his debut on 27 September 1942, on the first day of the 1942–1943 season, Barcelona lost 3–0 away to Real Madrid.

He spent 9 years in the starting line-up at Barcelona. He played as a defender and won three league titles, playing 178 league games and scoring once.

Curta made his international debut on 26 January 1947 in a 4–1 away friendly defeat to Portugal. He earned two more caps, both in friendlies, scoring an own goal in the latter, a 3–3 draw away to Switzerland on 20 June 1948.

Honours 
Barcelona
La Liga (3): 1944–45, 1947–48, 1948–49

See also 

 List of FC Barcelona players

References

External links 
 
 More information (in Spanish)

1922 births
1997 deaths
Spanish footballers
Footballers from Catalonia
People from Gironès
Sportspeople from the Province of Girona
Spain international footballers
Girona FC players
FC Barcelona players
La Liga players
Association football defenders
Catalonia international footballers